Joseph Edward McCarthy Jr. (born February 23, 1994) is an American professional baseball left fielder and first baseman in the Texas Rangers organization. He has played in Major League Baseball (MLB) for the San Francisco Giants. He played college baseball for the University of Virginia. The Tampa Bay Rays selected McCarthy in the fifth round of the 2015 MLB draft, and traded him to the Giants in 2019. McCarthy made his MLB debut in 2020.

Amateur career
McCarthy graduated from Scranton High School in Scranton, Pennsylvania. After his senior year, in 2012, The Scranton Times-Tribune named him their Male High School Athlete of the Year. 

McCarthy attended the University of Virginia, and played college baseball for the Virginia Cavaliers. In 2014, he played collegiate summer baseball with the Harwich Mariners of the Cape Cod Baseball League. His 2015 season debut was delayed by back surgery. In three seasons at Virginia, he played in 162 games with a .294 batting average, 12 home runs, 25 stolen bases in 27 attempts, and 111 RBIs, with 113 walks and 86 strikeouts.

Professional career

Tampa Bay Rays
The Tampa Bay Rays selected McCarthy in the fifth round, with the 148th overall selection, of the 2015 MLB draft. He signed with the Rays, receiving a $358,900 signing bonus. He began his professional career with the Hudson Valley Renegades of the Class A-Short Season New York-Penn League that same year and spent the whole season there, batting .277/.362/.337 with 21 RBIs and 18 stolen bases in 49 games.

McCarthy began the 2016 season with the Bowling Green Hot Rods of the Class A Midwest League. In June, the Rays promoted him to the Charlotte Stone Crabs of the Class A-Advanced Florida State League. In 104 total games between the two teams, he slashed .285/.398/.430 with eight home runs, 60 RBIs, and 19 stolen bases. 

In 2017, he played for the Montgomery Biscuits of the Class AA Southern League where he batted .284/.409.434 with seven home runs, 56 RBIs, 20 stolen bases, and an .843 OPS in 127 games.

The Rays invited McCarthy to spring training in 2018. He spent the 2018 season with the Durham Bulls of the Class AAA International League, with whom he batted .269/.377/.513, and then played for the Peoria Javelinas of the Arizona Fall League. The Rays added him to their 40-man roster after the season.

San Francisco Giants
On July 31, 2019, the Rays traded McCarthy to the San Francisco Giants in exchange for Jacob Lopez. He was assigned to the Sacramento River Cats following the trade, and hit .165/.247/.241/.488 with 1 home run and 4 RBIs for them in 79 at bats.

McCarthy made the Giants' Opening Day roster in 2020, and he made his MLB debut on Opening Day starting right fielder. On August 20, 2020, McCarthy was designated for assignment. The Giants outrighted him to the major leagues on August 27.

McCarthy spent the 2021 season with Triple-A Sacramento. He played in 64 games, hitting .305 with 15 home runs and 55 RBI's. McCarthy became a minor league free agent following the season on November 7, 2021.

Orix Buffaloes
On February 2, 2022, McCarthy signed a minor league contract with the Texas Rangers organization. On April 15, McCarthy agreed to a contract with the Orix Buffaloes of Nippon Professional Baseball. McCarthy was officially released on April 20 so he could report to the team. He became a free agent following the 2022 season.

Texas Rangers
On December 21, 2022, McCarthy signed a minor league deal with the Rangers, receiving an invitation to spring training.

Personal life
McCarthy's father, Joe Sr., played college baseball for the University of South Carolina. His brother, Jake, also played for Virginia and was drafted by the Arizona Diamondbacks in the first round of the 2018 Major League Baseball Draft.

References

External links

1994 births
Living people
Charlotte Stone Crabs players
Baseball players from Pennsylvania
Bowling Green Hot Rods players
Durham Bulls players
Gulf Coast Rays players
Harwich Mariners players
Hudson Valley Renegades players
Major League Baseball outfielders
Montgomery Biscuits players
Orix Buffaloes players
Peoria Javelinas players
Sacramento River Cats players
San Francisco Giants players
Sportspeople from Scranton, Pennsylvania
Virginia Cavaliers baseball players
Madison Mallards players
American expatriate baseball players in Japan